Samuel Hernanz Obrador (born 15 April 1986) is a French-born Spanish slalom canoeist who has competed at the international level since 2004 He represented France in his first international season.

Hernanz won a gold medal in the K1 team event at the 2019 ICF Canoe Slalom World Championships in La Seu d'Urgell. He also won one silver and two bronzes at the European Championships.

At the 2012 Summer Olympics he competed in the K1 event where he finished in 5th place.

His father Richard represented France in canoe slalom.

World Cup individual podiums

References

External links

Spanish male canoeists
1986 births
Living people
Olympic canoeists of Spain
Canoeists at the 2012 Summer Olympics
Spanish people of French descent
Medalists at the ICF Canoe Slalom World Championships